Mule Creek State Prison (MCSP) is a California State Prison for men.  It was opened in June 1987, and covers  located in Ione, California. The prison has a staff of 1,242 and an annual operating budget of $157 million.

As of July 31, 2022, MCSP was incarcerating people at 115.2% of its design capacity, with 3,785 occupants.

SNY Facility

In 2005, MCSP became the only California state prison exclusively for Sensitive Needs Yards (SNY) inmates. SNY inmates are segregated from the general prison population for their own safety. Many are gang dropouts, informants, sex offenders, and former law enforcement officers.

Notable inmates

Current notable inmates

Michael Carson – Serial killer
Billy Lee Chadd – Serial killer
Charley Charles née Charles Rothenberg – attempted murder of his son David by burning
John Albert Gardner – Rapist and killer
Joshua Jenkins - Mass murderer
Luis Reynaldo "Tree Frog" Johnson - Pedophile, rapist, and kidnapper
Patrick Kearney – Prolific serial killer, rapist, and necrophile
James Michael Munro – Accomplice of serial killer William Bonin
Scott Peterson - Murderer
Robert Rozier – Former football player and convicted serial killer
Rollen Stewart – Convicted kidnapper
Anthony Wimberly - Serial killer

Former notable inmates
Robert John Bardo – Stalker and killer of Rebecca Schaeffer, transferred to Avenal State Prison in Avenal, California
John Linley Frazier – Mass murderer; committed suicide by hanging in 2009
Roger Kibbe – Serial killer and rapist; killed at Mule Creek in 2021
Suge Knight – Record producer, music executive, former American football player released in 2004, later charged with manslaughter
Bruce Lisker – Wrongfully convicted of murder; released in 2009
Big Lurch – Former rapper convicted of killing and cannibalizing his roommate, transferred to California Health Care Facility in Stockton, California
Andrew Luster – Rapist, transferred to Valley State Prison
Lyle Menendez – Killed his parents alongside his brother, transferred to Richard J. Donovan Correctional Facility in San Diego
Gregory Matthews Miley – Accomplice of serial killer William Bonin; murdered in 2016
Herbert Mullin – Serial killer and mass murderer, died in prison in August 2022
Gregory Powell – Kidnapped two police officers and killed one of them; died of prostate cancer in 2012
Geronimo Pratt – Military veteran wrongfully convicted of murder; released in 1997 and died of a heart attack in 2011
Hans Reiser – Former computer programmer and entrepreneur convicted of killing his wife, transferred to Correctional Training Facility in Soledad, California
David Turpin – Convicted of kidnapping and torturing his own children, transferred to California State Prison, Corcoran
Charles 'Tex' Watson – Manson family cult member; later transferred to Richard J. Donovan Correctional Facility

References

External links

 Mule Creek State Prison – Official website

1987 establishments in California
Prisons in California
Buildings and structures in Amador County, California